Yankeetown is an unincorporated community in Darke County, in the U.S. state of Ohio.

History
A post office called Yankeetown was established in 1851, and remained in operation until 1865. A church was built at Yankeetown in 1912.

References

Unincorporated communities in Darke County, Ohio
Unincorporated communities in Ohio